Paul Münstermann (18 June 1932 – 30 August 2010) was a German agent, the former Vice President of the Federal Intelligence Service (Bundesnachrichtendienst).

References

1932 births
2010 deaths
20th-century German people
Christian Social Union in Bavaria politicians
People of the Federal Intelligence Service